Aaron Henneman (born 13 December 1980) is a former Australian rules footballer who played with Essendon in the Australian Football League (AFL). Henneman joined YVMDFL club Silvan in 2007 after being delisted by Essendon the year before. Joining ex Essendon teammates at Silvan including Gary Moorcroft, Ben Haynes and Marc Bullen. Henneman  played a starring role at CHB in the Cats premiership the same year. Has been playing a starring forward role in recent times for the Oakleigh football club despite a tough time with recent shoulder injuries.

Recruitment
Henneman won the 1997 Ovens & Murray Football League Under 18 best and fairest award, the Leo Dean Medal, before joining the Murray Bushrangers. His career with the Essendon Football Club began when he was drafted from Corowa-Rutherglen, (the same team as Adam, Josh, Damian and Ryan Houlihan) in the 1998 AFL Draft at pick 25. He made his debut in 2000 and with his 194 cm, 99 kg frame, he had been touted as a promising key defender and ruckman.

Essendon career
Henneman played 58 games with the Essendon Football Club. He was injury stricken at Essendon, which meant he did not get as many games as he wanted. As well as this, Henneman only got into tribunal trouble just once, when he was banned for two matches for striking Sydney's Adam Schneider during a match in 2005.

He was delisted at the end of 2006.

External links 

Essendon Football Club past player profile

Essendon Football Club players
1980 births
Living people
Murray Bushrangers players
Corowa-Rutherglen Football Club players
Australian rules footballers from New South Wales